Tin-silver-copper (Sn-Ag-Cu, also known as SAC), is a lead-free (Pb-free) alloy commonly used for electronic solder. It is the main choice for lead-free surface-mount technology (SMT) assembly in the industry, as it is near eutectic, with adequate thermal fatigue properties, strength, and wettability. Lead-free solder is gaining much attention as the environmental effects of lead in industrial products is recognized, and as a result of Europe's RoHS legislation to remove lead and other hazardous materials from electronics. Japanese electronics companies have also looked at Pb-free solder for its industrial advantages.

Typical alloys are 3–4% silver, 0.5–0.7% copper, and the balance (95%+) tin.  For example, the common "SAC305" solder is 3.0% silver and 0.5% copper.  Cheaper alternatives with less silver are used in some applications, such as SAC105 and SAC0307 (0.3% silver, 0.7% copper), at the expense of a somewhat higher melting point.

History
In 2000, there were several lead-free assemblies and chip products initiatives being driven by the Japan Electronic Industries Development Association (JEIDA) and Waste Electrical and Electronic Equipment Directive (WEEE). These initiatives resulted in tin-silver-copper alloys being considered and tested as lead-free solder ball alternatives for array product assemblies.

In 2003, tin-silver-copper was being used as a lead-free solder. However, its performance was criticized because it left a dull, irregular finish and it was difficult to keep the copper content under control. In 2005, tin-silver-copper alloys constituted approximately 65% of lead-free alloys used in the industry and this percentage has been increasing. Large companies such as Sony and Intel switched from using lead-containing solder to a tin-silver-copper alloy.

Constraints and tradeoffs
The process requirements for (Pb-free) SAC solders and Sn-Pb solders are different both materially and logistically for electronic assembly. In addition, the reliability of Sn-Pb solders is well established, while SAC solders are still undergoing study, (though much work has been done to justify the use of SAC solders, such as the iNEMI Lead Free Solder Project).

One important difference is that Pb-free soldering requires higher temperatures and increased process control to achieve the same results as that of the tin-lead method. The melting point of SAC alloys is 217–220°C, or about 34°C higher than the melting point of the eutectic tin-lead (63/37) alloy. This requires peak temperatures in the range of 235–245°C to achieve wetting and wicking.

Some of the components susceptible to SAC assembly temperatures are electrolytic capacitors, connectors, opto-electronics, and older style plastic components. However, a number of companies have started offering 260 °C compatible components to meet the requirements of Pb-free solders. iNEMI has proposed that a good target for development purposes would be around 260°C.

Also, SAC solders are alloyed with a larger number of metals so there is the potential for a far wider variety of intermetallics to be present in a solder joint. These more complex compositions can result in solder joint microstructures that are not as thoroughly studied as current tin-lead solder microstructures. These concerns are magnified by the unintentional use of lead-free solders in either processes designed solely for tin-lead solders or environments where material interactions are poorly understood. For example, the reworking of a tin-lead solder joint with Pb-free solder. These mixed-finish possibilities could negatively impact the solder's reliability.

Advantages
SAC solders have outperformed high-Pb solders C4 joints in ceramic ball grid array (CBGA) systems, which are ball-grid arrays with a ceramic substrate. The CBGA showed consistently better results in thermal cycling for Pb-free alloys. The findings also show that SAC alloys are proportionately better in thermal fatigue as the thermal cycling range decreases. SAC performs better than Sn-Pb at the less extreme cycling conditions. Another advantage of SAC is that it appears to be more resistant to gold embrittlement than Sn-Pb. In test results, the strength of the joints is substantially higher for the SAC alloys than the Sn-Pb alloy. Also, the failure mode is changed from a partially brittle joint separation to a ductile tearing with the SAC.

References

Tin alloys
Fusible alloys
Brazing and soldering